Stripped to the Bare Bones is a 1999 live acoustic album by English musician and songwriter Steve Harley. The album was produced by Harley and features Nick Pynn.

Background
Having returned to touring as Steve Harley & Cockney Rebel in 1989, Harley and his band would continue to tour throughout the 1990s. Although Harley had performed a small number of one-off acoustic-based shows during that time, his first acoustic tour would be the "Stripped to the Bare Bones" tour of 1998. In August 1997, Harley performed a string of casual, more acoustic-based, shows at the Edinburgh Fringe Festival. Accompanied by Cockney Rebel violinist/guitarist Nick Pynn, these shows consisted of music and chat about Harley's career. In November, he also performed an acoustic show at Castlemilk Festival in Glasgow. In the liner notes of Stripped to the Bare Bones, Harley revealed: 

The success of these shows led to Harley and Pynn playing over a hundred dates in 1998 as part of the "Stripped to the Bare Bones" tour. This tour included fifty-four concerts in the UK alone, while around ninety songs were rehearsed for use on the tour. Coinciding with the tour was the release of the new compilation album More Than Somewhat – The Very Best of Steve Harley. Harley commented: 

In March 1998, as part of the tour, Harley and Pynn played at The Jazz Café in London. This show was recorded using Sensible Music Ltd. and an ADAT system for possible release as a live album. During the show, Harley played acoustic guitar and harmonica, while Pynn played acoustic lead guitar, dulcimer, mando-cello and violin. Speaking of playing with Pynn, Harley commented: "It's a privilege to play with a musician of his calibre."

In September 1999, the album Stripped to the Bare Bones was released on the Burning Airlines label. The album featured fourteen live unplugged tracks from the show and CD liner notes by Kevin Cann. Of the included tracks on the CD, one was a new song titled "Only You". The song later appeared on the 2006 compilation The Cockney Rebel – A Steve Harley Anthology. A studio version later appeared on Harley's sixth solo album, Uncovered.

As Harley continued performing acoustic shows, Steve Harley & Cockney Rebel would not embark on a full tour until the "Back with the Band" UK tour of 2001. As the first acoustic album from Harley, two others would follow; Acoustic and Pure: Live in 2002, and Anytime! (A Live Set) in 2004.

Release
The album was released in the UK by Burning Airlines (NMC Ltd.). In 2000, it was re-issued under a new title Unplugged by the budget compilation label Brilliant, which is run by Digimode Entertainment Ltd. The re-issue features the same track-listing as Stripped to the Bare Bones, but has different artwork. Although Stripped to the Bare Bones is now out-of-print, Unplugged remains in print to date.

Critical reception

On its release, Simon Evans of The Birmingham Post praised Stripped to Bare Bones as a live album which "finds Harley in fine form". He stated, "'Mr Soft and 'Make Me Smile' are among the back catalogue numbers getting an acoustic makeover which works surprisingly well in both cases, and even the mini-epics 'Tumbling Down' and 'Sebastian' benefit from a more low-key approach. Fans will also delight in the presence of 'My Only Vice' and 'The Best Years of Our Lives', as well as a smattering of more recent material that stands up well in such august company."

Stephen Thomas Erlewine of AllMusic commented, "[This] album happens to be proof that Harley was a solid song-craftsman and a fine performer, more than just a glam has-been. His relaxed yet energetic performances and ease at storytelling make it a highly entertaining album, even for listeners who aren't familiar with his body of work." Dave Thompson of AllMusic reviewed the album's re-issue as Unplugged. He stated, "Harley's contribution to the "unplugged" bandwagon stands as one of the best. Harley is a most engaging host, punctuating songs with humor and anecdote, and if he does push the "gee, it's really great to be here" sincerity button a little too often for comfort, then that goes with the territory as well. A quarter of a century had passed since he was last considered a commercial force, yet his audience is as devotedly die-hard as ever, and the songs have held up remarkably well too."

Track listing

Personnel
 Steve Harley – vocals, acoustic guitar, harmonica, compiler
 Nick Pynn – acoustic lead guitar, dulcimer, mando-cello, violin

Production
 Kevin Whooley – engineer
 Carlton P. Sandercock-Rout – project concept for NMC Ltd., compiler
 Patrick Bird – mixing, mastering for Sound Discs Ltd.

Other
 Andy Abbott – centre photograph (courtesy of The East Anglian Daily Times)
 G.D. Young – cover photograph, inside photography
 S. Raulfs, Ann Meuer – inside photography
 Becky Stewart – design, layout

References

1999 live albums
Steve Harley albums